Verónica Castro, full name Verónica Judith Sáinz Castro (born 19 October 1952), is a Mexican actress, singer, producer, former model and presenter.

She started her career as a television actress, where she met comedian Manuel Valdés, father of her son Cristian Castro, and in fotonovelas and telenovelas while earning her degree in international relations.

Acting and music career

In 1986, she performed in the Latin version of "We Are The World", Cantare, cantaras. She also released one of her most ambitious albums to date, Simplemente Todo. The top-selling singles from Simplemente Todo were "Oye Tu," the title selection, "Nunca Lo Sabra," and "Macumba." Unlike other artists of the time, however, Castro accompanied her singles with videos, becoming one of the pioneers of the MTV age in Latin America. Even as she recorded the music video "Macumba," she worked in telenovelas in Argentina and Italy.

During the 1990s, she began hosting variety shows, and has continued to do so since. Her son, Cristian, is a teen idol singer across Latin America and the United States.

In 2009 Verónica Castro went back to telenovelas, and left her native Mexico for Argentina to film the telenovela Los Exitosos Pérez. It premiered in Mexico on August 30, 2009.

In 2017, she was cast as the matronly Virginia de la Mora in Netflix's The House of Flowers, a Mexican comedy-drama series. It premiered on Netflix in August 2018.

Stage credits

Albums

Films

Telenovelas

TV shows

Dubbing

Sources
 Official Website of Veronica Castro
 Official Fan Mail: Correo de Fans Verónica Castro 1707 Post Oak Blvd. #261, Houston, TX USA 77056

References

External links

1952 births
Living people
Mexican telenovela actresses
Mexican television actresses
Mexican film actresses
Mexican stage actresses
Mexican women singers
Mexican telenovela producers
Mexican television presenters
Mexican television talk show hosts
20th-century Mexican actresses
21st-century Mexican actresses
Actresses from Mexico City
Singers from Mexico City
National Autonomous University of Mexico alumni
People from Mexico City
Women television producers
Mexican women television presenters
Women in Latin music